The Leasehold Reform (Ground Rent) Act 2022 (c.1) is an Act of the Parliament of the United Kingdom. It defined the peppercorn rent as a price of one peppercorn per year and prohibited ground rent greater than that price on new leases.

Raising ground rent had prevented purchaser of a leasehold property in England to sell their home as the lenders refused to approve a mortgage. This act is a part of the UK government's programme to reform the leasehold system.

See also
Leasehold Reform Act 1967
Commonhold and Leasehold Reform Act 2002

References 

English property law
United Kingdom Acts of Parliament 2022
Housing legislation in the United Kingdom